Continuation is an outdoor 2009 granite series of sculptures by Japanese artist Michihiro Kosuge, installed along Portland, Oregon's Transit Mall, in the United States. It is part of the City of Portland and Multnomah County Public Art Collection courtesy of the Regional Arts & Culture Council, which administers the work.

Description

Michihiro Kosuge's Continuation (2009) is a series of carved red granite sculptures installed along Southwest 6th Avenue and Southwest Clay Street between Columbia and Clay in the Portland Transit Mall. The five pieces measure  x  x ,  x  x ,  x  x ,  x  x ,  x  x , respectively. The artist re-used granite from a fountain and sculpture previously installed along the mall.

According to the Regional Arts & Culture Council, which administers the work:

The sculpture is part of the City of Portland and Multnomah County Public Art Collection courtesy of the Regional Arts & Culture Council.

See also

 2009 in art

References

External links
 Creating Place: Michihiro Kosuge and Sculpture in the Landscape by Tamara Paulat, Pacific Horticulture Society

2009 establishments in Oregon
2009 sculptures
Granite sculptures in Oregon
Outdoor sculptures in Portland, Oregon
Sculptures on the MAX Green Line
Southwest Portland, Oregon